Armand Bois (1920-2001) was a politician in Quebec, and a Member of the National Assembly of Quebec (MNA).

Background

He was born in Saint-Jean-Port-Joli, Quebec, on April 21, 1920, and served as a military officer during World War II.  Subsequently, he became an army reservist and an insurance agent.

Mayor

Bois served as Mayor of Les Saules, Quebec, from 1959 to 1963.

Provincial politics

He ran as a candidate of the newly formed provincial wing of the Ralliement créditiste in 1970 and won, becoming the Member of the National Assembly for the district of Saint-Sauveur.

During his term of office, the party was plagued by internal divisions.  While three MNAs remained loyal to Leader Camil Samson, the rest of the caucus withdrew its support and appointed Bois as temporary leader, until a leadership convention could determine a new leader.

A year later Yvon Dupuis was chosen as leader.  Nonetheless, Bois and most of his colleagues lost their bid for re-election in 1973.

Death

Bois died on August 31, 2001.

Footnotes

See also
 History of Quebec

1920 births
2001 deaths
Mayors of places in Quebec
Ralliement créditiste du Québec MNAs